Troubelice is a municipality and village in Olomouc District in the Olomouc Region of the Czech Republic. It has about 1,900 inhabitants.

Administrative parts
Villages of Dědinka, Lazce and Pískov are administrative parts of Troubelice.

References

Villages in Olomouc District